"Takin' It to the Streets" is a song by the American rock band The Doobie Brothers from the album of the same name. It was their first single with Michael McDonald on vocals and was written by McDonald.

Reception
The song peaked at number 13 in the US and number 7 in Canada.

Cash Box stated that "both instrumentally and vocally this is the best thing the Doobie Brothers have done to date," adding that "the melody is based around a strong chordal structure" and that the repetition of the song title in the chorus has "maximum hook potential." Record World said that the song "has all the essential qualities that have contributed to making this group a dominating chart force" and that "all these ingredients are wrapped together in an appealing package."

Ultimate Classic Rock critic Michael Gallucci rated "Takin' It to the Streets" as the Doobie Brothers' 6th greatest song, praising McDonald's "soulful rasp" on the vocal.  The staff of Billboard rated it as the Doobie Brothers' 3rd best song, saying that it "hits an elemental theme and drives it home with soulful urgency."

Personnel

Michael McDonald – piano, lead vocals
Patrick Simmons – guitar, backing vocals
Jeff "Skunk" Baxter – guitar
Tiran Porter – bass, backing vocals
John Hartman – drums
Keith Knudsen – drums, backing vocals

Additional personnel
Jesse Butler – organ
Bobby LaKind – congas
Ted Templeman – tambourine, handclaps
The Memphis Horns – saxophones

Chart performance

Weekly charts

Year-end charts

Christine Anu and Deni Hines version

In November 2008, Australian singers Christine Anu and Deni Hines recorded and released a version of the song. 50% of net profits of the song went to the Salvation Army's Oasis Youth Support Network and the Everyone Is Homeless Fund. Anu and Hines promoted the single with a tour throughout May and June 2009.

Track listing
 "Takin It to the Streets" – 3:33
 "Nak E Ba Na Na" by Christine Anu – 3:01
 "Freedom" by Deni Hines – 3:43

In popular culture 
 On February 4, 1978, the song was played in an episode of the American comedy series "What's Happening!!".
 In 2005, the song was played in the American comedy film "The 40-Year-Old Virgin".
 The song has been used as the theme music for the Sam Newman-hosted segment "Street Talk" on The Footy Show (covering the Australian Football League) since the program debuted in 1994.

References

The Doobie Brothers songs
Christine Anu songs
Song recordings produced by Ted Templeman
Songs written by Michael McDonald (musician)
1976 singles
2008 singles
Warner Records singles
1976 songs